Viorica Ioja (later Vereş; born 26 February 1962) is a retired Romanian rowing coxswain. Competing in coxed fours she won an Olympic gold medal in 1984 and the world title in 1986, placing second in 1983 and 1985.

References

External links
 
 
 
 

1962 births
Living people
Romanian female rowers
Rowers at the 1984 Summer Olympics
Olympic silver medalists for Romania
Olympic gold medalists for Romania
Coxswains (rowing)
Olympic rowers of Romania
Olympic medalists in rowing
World Rowing Championships medalists for Romania
Medalists at the 1984 Summer Olympics